Catherine Adifaka is a senior government official in the Solomon Islands. She was the first woman to be appointed as the Solomon Islands' Public Service Commissioner.

Life 
Adifaka was appointed to the Constitutional Congress of the Solomon Islands in 2007.

References

Solomon Islands women in politics
Living people
Year of birth missing (living people)